Thomas Aloysius Dornin (b. in Ireland, 1800; d. at Savannah, Georgia, U.S.A., 22 April 1874) was an American naval officer.

He entered the United States Navy, 2 May 1815, as a midshipman, from Maryland.

In 1841 he was promoted commander and helped to successfully carry out an expedition to prevent the invasion of Mexican territory by the filibuster William Walker. After being commissioned captain, in 1855, he engaged in destroying the slave trade as commander of the sloop . 

During the American Civil War he attained the rank of commodore on the retired list, 16 July 1862, and at its close was put in charge of the fifth lighthouse district.

Family
His father was Bernard Dornin, the publisher.

References

Attribution

1800 births
1874 deaths
United States Navy officers